The 2011 Mid-American Conference football season is the 66th season for the Mid-American Conference (MAC). The season began on Thursday, September 1, with four games: Bowling Green played at Idaho, Central Michigan hosted South Carolina State, Temple hosted #14 (FCS) Villanova, and Toledo hosted #10 (FCS) New Hampshire. The conference's other nine teams began their respective 2011 seasons of NCAA Division I FBS (Football Bowl Subdivision) competition on Saturday, September 3. The first in-conference game was September 10, with Temple hosting Akron.

Previous season

Preseason

Preseason poll
The 2011 MAC Preseason poll results were announced at the Football Media Preview in Detroit on July 26. In the East Division, Miami was picked as champion, while Toledo was picked to win the West Division and the MAC Championship Game.

East Division
 Miami - 97 points; 4 first-place votes
 Ohio - 96 points; 8 first-place votes
 Temple - 88 points; 4 first-place votes
 Kent State - 57 points
 Bowling Green - 48 points
 Buffalo - 37 points
 Akron - 25 points

West Division
 Toledo - 83 points; 8 first-place votes
 NIU - 81 points; 5 first-place votes
 Western Michigan - 76 points; 2 first-place votes
 Central Michigan - 55 points; 1 first-place vote
 Ball State - 27 points
 Eastern Michigan - 24 points

MAC Championship
Three votes were not cast for any team.

 Toledo - 5 votes
 NIU - 3 votes
 Miami - 3 votes
 Ohio - 1 vote
 Western Michigan - 1 vote

Head coaches

East Division
 Rob Ianello, Akron (2nd Year)
 Dave Clawson, Bowling Green (3rd Year)
 Jeff Quinn, Buffalo (2nd Year)
 Darrell Hazell, Kent State (1st Year)
 Don Treadwell, Miami (1st Year)
 Frank Solich, Ohio (7th Year)
 Steve Addazio, Temple (1st Year)

West Division
 Pete Lembo, Ball State (1st Year)
 Dan Enos, Central Michigan (2nd Year)
 Ron English, Eastern Michigan (3rd Year)
 Dave Doeren, NIU (1st Year)
 Tim Beckman, Toledo (3rd Year)
 Bill Cubit Western Michigan (7th Year)

Pre-season coaching changes

On November 21, the day after Kent State's seventh loss of the season assured them of a losing record, Doug Martin announced that he would resign at the end of the season. On December 20, Kent State athletic director Joel Nielsen introduced former Ohio State receivers coach Darrell Hazell as the new head coach for the Golden Flashes. Hazell was the first Ohio State assistant coach to leave for a head coaching job in six years; the last was Mark Snyder, who was hired by Marshall in 2004.

On November 23, three days after Ball State concluded its season with a 4-8 record, Ball State athletic director Tom Collins announced the firing of Stan Parrish, saying, "As we evaluated the on-field performance and the football program in its entirety, we decided it was time for a change in direction in the leadership of the program". On December 19, Collins announced that he had hired Pete Lembo, formerly the head coach at Elon.

On December 5, NIU head coach Jerry Kill accepted the position of head coach for the Minnesota Golden Gophers.  His announcement came less than two weeks before the Huskies were scheduled to play in the Humanitarian Bowl.  Leaving the team in the manner he did (many teammates learned about his new job via Twitter instead of from Kill himself) dealt an emotional blow to the members of the team; star quarterback Chandler Harnish saying about Kill's departure, "I have a horrible taste in my mouth".  Additionally, besides the emotional impact, USA Today noted "The timing of the announcement further hurts the program due to Kill most likely taking the bulk of his staff to Minnesota."  On December 9, linebackers coach Tom Matukewicz was announced as the interim head coach for the Huskies bowl game, and on December 13, the university hired Wisconsin Badgers defensive coordinator Dave Doeren as the head coach, to begin after the Humanitarian Bowl.

On December 12, ESPN reported that Al Golden was offered and accepted the head coaching job at the University of Miami. Prior to the 2010 season, provisions requiring bowls to pick teams with seven or more wins if available before picking six-win teams were eliminated from NCAA bylaws, and Temple was the first team go uninvited under the rule change, despite going 8–4 including a win over eventual Big East BCS representative Connecticut. On December 22, a rumor was quickly confirmed that Florida offensive coordinator, and former Florida interim head coach (winter of 2009-2010), Steve Addazio would be the new Temple coach.

On December 16, ESPN reported that Michael Haywood, who had been named the 2010 Mid-American Conference Football Coach of the Year days before, had accepted the head football coaching position at the University of Pittsburgh. Haywood was arrested in South Bend, Indiana on December 31, 2010 on felony domestic violence charges arising from a custody dispute, and was fired by Pittsburgh hours after being released on bond the next morning. Defensive backs coach Lance Guidry will coach Miami University in the 2011 GoDaddy.com Bowl. On December 31, 2010, Miami University hired Michigan State offensive coordinator Don Treadwell as its head coach.

References